Manfred Perfler is an Italian para-alpine skier.

He won the bronze medal at the Men's Giant Slalom B3 event at the 1988 Winter Paralympics and at the Men's Slalom B3 event at the 1994 Winter Paralympics. He also competed at the Men's Downhill B3 event but did not finish.

References 

Living people
Place of birth missing (living people)
Italian male alpine skiers
Paralympic alpine skiers of Italy
Alpine skiers at the 1988 Winter Paralympics
Alpine skiers at the 1994 Winter Paralympics
Medalists at the 1988 Winter Paralympics
Medalists at the 1994 Winter Paralympics
Paralympic bronze medalists for Italy
Paralympic medalists in alpine skiing
1963 births
20th-century Italian people